Joseph Sparks was a Negro league infielder between 1937 and 1940.

Sparks made his Negro leagues debut in 1937 with the St. Louis Stars and the Chicago American Giants. He went on to play three more seasons for Chicago through 1940.

References

External links
 and Seamheads

Place of birth missing
Place of death missing
Year of birth missing
Year of death missing
Chicago American Giants players
St. Louis Stars (1937) players
Baseball infielders